Aliabad-e Damaq (also Romanized as Alīābād-e Damaq and ‘Alīābad Damāq; also known as ‘Alīābād and  ‘Alīābād-e Damāgh) is a village in Almahdi Rural District, Jowkar District, Malayer County, Hamadan Province, Iran. At the 2006 census, its population was 6,673, in 1,493 families.

References 

Populated places in Malayer County